Halstead Dorey (February 7, 1874 – June 19, 1946) was a highly decorated officer in the United States Army with the rank of major general. A graduate of West Point, Dorey distinguished himself as Colonel and Commanding officer, 4th Infantry Regiment during World War I and was decorated with Distinguished Service Cross, the second highest military award for extreme gallantry in combat, and also received the Distinguished Service Medal.

Following the War, he rose to the general's rank and commanded famed 2nd Infantry Division or Hawaiian Department and retired from active duty in 1935.

Biography

Halstead Dorey was born on February 7, 1874, in St. Louis, Missouri as the son of William A. Dorey and Georgiana B. Banks. Following the graduation from the Shattuck Military Academy in Faribault, Minnesota, Dorey received an appointment to the United States Military Academy at West Point, New York, in May 1893, where he excelled and reached the rank of Cadet Captain and capacity of battalion commander.

Among his classmates were several other future generals: Thomas Q. Ashburn, Harry G. Bishop, Albert J. Bowley, Charles H. Bridges, Sherwood A. Cheney, Edgar T. Collins, Edgar T. Conley, William D. Connor, Harley B. Ferguson, Harold B. Fiske, Frank Ross McCoy, Andrew Moses or Charles DuVal Roberts.

He graduated with Bachelor of Science degree in June 1897 and was commissioned second lieutenant in the Infantry branch. Dorey was subsequently assigned to the 23rd Infantry Regiment at Fort Brown, Texas, and remained there until he was transferred to the 4th Infantry Regiment.

Dorey sailed with the regiment to Cuba in April 1898 during the Spanish–American War and took part in the Battle of El Caney and Siege of Santiago in July that year. He later took part in the Philippine–American War and served as 4th Infantry Regiment's Aide-de-Camp in the combat operations against Moros at Zamboanga and Manila. Dorey commanded as Captain the battalion of Philippine Scouts at Mindanao and was appointed Aide-de-Camp to Major general Leonard Wood, who served as the governor of Moro Province, a stronghold of Muslim rebellion. Dorey was decorated with his first Silver Star for his bravery on Philippines.

Following the United States' entry into World War I in April 1917, Dorey was appointed Aide-de-Camp to his former superior and now Commanding general of Camp Funston, Kansas, Major general Leonard Wood. General Wood was responsible for the training of nearly 40,000 men and appointed Dorey as a commanding officer of the Citizens' Military Training Camp, the first businessmen's training camp at Plattsburgh, New York. He later received temporary promotion to Colonel and embarked for France in early 1918. Dorey assumed duty as Commanding officer, 4th Infantry Regiment and led it for the duration of the War.

Dorey led his regiment during the defensive actions of Aisne, Château-Thierry, Second Battle of the Marne, and in the Third Battle of the Aisne, Saint-Mihiel, Meuse-Argonne offensives. He distinguished himself in the combats north of Montfaucon on October 15, 1918, when during a 12 days' continuous fighting against stubborn resistance, his regiment suffered heavy casualties. Colonel Dorey, himself suffering from a painful wound, went forward from his post of command through a heavy enemy barrage to the front line, where he reorganized his forces and directed the attacking units for two days, until he was again severely wounded. His conspicuous bravery inspired his troops to the successful assault of a strongly fortified ravine and woods which were of vital importance and resulted in the capture of numerous prisoners and much material.

He remained in command of the regiment until October 20, 1918, when he was ordered to the rear for treatment. For his service with 4th Infantry Regiment, Dorey received Distinguished Service Cross, the second highest military award for extreme gallantry in combat, and Army Distinguished Service Medal. He was also decorated with Legion of Honour, rank Officer and Croix de guerre 1914–1918 with Palm by the Government of France.

Following the war, Dorey reached the rank of Brigadier general and commanded 14th Infantry Brigade from January 30, 1923, to February 12, 1925; 18th Infantry Brigade from December 1927 to October 16, 1928, and graduated from the Army War College. He was promoted to Major general in November 1933 and assumed command of 2nd Infantry Division following month.

Dorey was ordered to Hawaii in June 1934 and commanded Hawaiian Division with additional duty as temporary commanding general of Hawaiian Department until March 1935. General Dorey retired from active duty in December 1935 and settled at Fort Sam Houston, Texas.

Upon his retirement, Dorey was active in Army and Navy Club and Episcopal Church. Major general Halstead Dorey died on June 19, 1946, in San Antonio, Texas, and was buried at United States Military Academy Cemetery. He was survived by his wife, Theodora Cheney Dorey of Manchester, Connecticut and his daughters: Edna Dorey and Georgiana.

Decorations and medals

Here is the ribbon bar of general Dorey:

See also
2nd Infantry Division

References

1874 births
1946 deaths
United States Army Infantry Branch personnel
Military personnel from Missouri
People from St. Louis
United States Army generals
United States Military Academy alumni
United States Army War College alumni
American military personnel of the Spanish–American War
American military personnel of the Philippine–American War
United States Army personnel of World War I
Recipients of the Distinguished Service Cross (United States)
Recipients of the Distinguished Service Medal (US Army)
Recipients of the Silver Star
Recipients of the Legion of Honour
Recipients of the Croix de Guerre 1914–1918 (France)